Amborondra is a town and commune in Madagascar. It belongs to the district of Manakara, which is a part of Vatovavy-Fitovinany Region. The population of the commune was estimated to be approximately 14,000 in 2001 commune census.

Only primary schooling is available. The majority 98% of the population of the commune are farmers.  The most important crops are coffee and rice, while other important agricultural products are bananas and cassava. Services provide employment for 2% of the population.

References and notes 

Populated places in Vatovavy-Fitovinany